Euphorbia horrida, the African milk barrel, is a species of flowering plant in the family Euphorbiaceae, native to South Africa. It is a cactus-like shrub showing remarkable similarities to the true cacti of the New World, and thus an example of convergent evolution. In temperate regions it must be grown in heated conditions under glass.

It develops new shoots laterally at the base of the plant (offset)s, often forming roots and thus a successful means of propagation.

The Latin specific epithet horrida means "with many prickles".

This plant has gained the Royal Horticultural Society's Award of Garden Merit.

References

horrida